C. rufus may refer to:
 Canis rufus, the red wolf, a mammal species
 Cursorius rufus, the Burchell's courser, a bird species

See also
 Rufus (disambiguation)
 Calvisius Rufus, a governor of Britannia Inferior, a province of Roman Britain